The 2016 DHB-Pokal was the 40th edition of the tournament.

Format
The first round was split in a north and a south part and played in mini tournaments where only the winner advanced to the round of 16. From there on a knockout system was used to determine the winner. The final four was played on one weekend in Hamburg.

Round 1
Games were played on 15 and 16 August 2015.

|-
|colspan=3 style="text-align:center;" |Played in Emsdetten

|-
|colspan=3 style="text-align:center;" |Played in Aue

|-
|colspan=3 style="text-align:center;" |Played in Solingen

|-
|colspan=3 style="text-align:center;" |Played in Rostock

|-
|colspan=3 style="text-align:center;" |Played in Hamm

|-
|colspan=3 style="text-align:center;" |Played in Hildesheim

|-
|colspan=3 style="text-align:center;" |Played in Lingen

|-
|colspan=3 style="text-align:center;" |Played in Leipzig

|-
|colspan=3 style="text-align:center;" |Played in Essen

|-
|colspan=3 style="text-align:center;" |Played in Coburg

|-
|colspan=3 style="text-align:center;" |Played in Nußloch

|-
|colspan=3 style="text-align:center;" |Played in Saarlouis

|-
|colspan=3 style="text-align:center;" |Played in Kornwestheim

|-
|colspan=3 style="text-align:center;" |Played in Eisenach

|-
|colspan=3 style="text-align:center;" |Played in Rimpar

|-
|colspan=3 style="text-align:center;" |Played in Hagen

|}

Round 2
The draw was held on 6 September 2015.

Quarterfinals
The draw was held on 1 November 2015.

Final four
The final four was held on 30 April and 1 May 2016 at the Barclaycard Arena in Hamburg.

Bracket

Semifinals

Final

References

External links
Official website

2016